is a passenger railway station located in the town of Ōtoyo, Nagaoka District, Kōchi Prefecture, Japan. It is operated by JR Shikoku and has the station number "D31".

Lines

Layout
The station, which is unstaffed, consists of a side platform serving a single track. By the side of the access road, a waiting room and bike shed have been erected. From there, a short flight of steps leads up to the platform which also has a weather shelter.

Adjacent stations

History
At this time the station was operated by Japanese Government Railways, later becoming Japanese National Railways (JNR). With the privatization of JNR on 1 April 1987, control of the station passed to JR Shikoku.

Surrounding area
The station is a little far from the village of Anai, and there are few private houses around the station.
Otoyo Municipal Ananai Elementary School/Junior High School (closed)
 Japan National Route 32

See also
 List of Railway Stations in Japan

References

External links

JR Shikoku timetable 

Railway stations in Kōchi Prefecture
Railway stations in Japan opened in 1934
Ōtoyo, Kōchi